UCLA is the University of California, Los Angeles, an American public research university in Los Angeles.

UCLA or Ucla may also refer to:
Uniform Collaborative Law  Act, a uniform law drafted by the National Conference of Commissioners on Uniform State Laws
Unilaterally Controlled Latino Assets, a destabilization group through CIA assets
Universidad Centroccidental Lisandro Alvarado, a Venezuelan public university
Ucla (fish), a genus of fishes

See also
 ACLU